Chennai Central Mangaluru Superfast Express is a Superfast train belonging to Southern Railway zone of Indian Railways  that run between Chennai Central (MAS) and Mangaluru Central (MAQ) in India.

Till 25 February 2016, it was running with ICF Coaches after 26 February 2016 its converted into LHB Coaches.

Service
The frequency of this train is daily and covers the distance of 889 km with an average speed of 56 km/h with a total time of 15 hours.

Coach composition

The train has total 21 coaches:

 1 AC First Class cum AC Two Tier, 
 2 AC Two Tier, 
 4 AC Three Tier, 
 1 AC Three Tier Economy, 
 8 Sleeper Class, 
 3 General Unreserved, 
 1 Luggage Cum Disabled Coach, 
 1 End On Generator Coach

Routes

Traction
As the route is fully electrified a WAP-4 Arakkonam, WAP-7 of Royapuram or Erode Based pulls the train to its destination on both sides.

Incident
On 26 Feb 2019, The two coaches of Chennai Mangalore Superfast Express was derailed at around morning at Shoranur Junction there were no casualties reported.

Corona Virus Special Train 
During the Corona Virus Pandemic in India, the express train was renamed to MGR Chennai Mangaluru Super Fast COVID-19 Special. It has the same no.of stops and the same amount of distance is covered.

External links
 12685 Chennai Mangalore Express
 12686 Mangalore Chennai Express
02685 Chennai Mangalore COVID-19 Special Superfast Express

References

Express trains in India
Transport in Chennai
Transport in Mangalore
Rail transport in Tamil Nadu
Rail transport in Kerala
Rail transport in Karnataka